Papantla Totonac, also known as Lowland Totonac, is a native American language spoken in central Mexico, in the state of Veracruz around the city of Papantla.

Notes

External links

Diccionario totonaco de Papantla (Aschmann 1973)

Indigenous languages of Mexico
Totonacan languages